Polyptychus is a genus of moths in the family Sphingidae erected by Jacob Hübner in 1819. These middle-sized, light-brown moths are found in Africa and Southeast Asia.

Description 
They are a middle-sized to large (wingspan 65–120 mm), light-brown hawk moth. The head is unusually large in subfamily Smerinthinae, with the back of the body long and cylindrical.

Life 
These moths fly at night and do not visit flowers, and they do not particularly seek out light. In all cases, they lay their eggs in the plants of the family Boraginaceae.

Species list 
 Polyptychus affinis Rothschild & Jordan, 1903 – Africa
 Polyptychus andosa (Walker 1856)
 Polyptychus anochus Rothschild & Jordan 1906
 Polyptychus aurora Clark 1936
 Polyptychus baltus Pierre 1985
 (Polyptychus barnsi) Clark 1926
 Polyptychus baxteri Rothschild & Jordan 1908
 Polyptychus bernardii Rougeot 1966
 Polyptychus carteri (Butler, 1882) – West Africa
 Polyptychus chinensis Rothschild & Jordan, 1903 – central and southwest China, Taiwan, Ryukyu Islands
 Polyptychus claudiae Brechlin, Kitching & Cadiou, 2001
 Polyptychus coryndoni Rothschild & Jordan 1903
 Polyptychus dentatus (Cramer, 1777) – Sri Lanka, India and Pakistan
 Polyptychus distensus Darge 1990
 Polyptychus enodia (Holland 1889)
 Polyptychus girardi Pierre 1993
 Polyptychus herbuloti Darge 1990
 Polyptychus hollandi Rothschild & Jordan 1903
 Polyptychus lapidatus Joicey & Kaye 1917
 Polyptychus murinus Rothschild 1904
 Polyptychus nigriplaga Rothschild & Jordan 1903
 Polyptychus orthographus Rothschild & Jordan 1903
 Polyptychus paupercula Holland 1889
 Polyptychus pierrei Kitching & Cadiou, 2000
 Polyptychus potiendus Darge 1990
 Polyptychus retusus Rothschild & Jordan, 1908
 Polyptychus rougeoti Carcasson 1968
 Polyptychus sinus Pierre 1985
 Polyptychus thihongae Bernardi 1970
 Polyptychus trilineatus Moore, 1888 – India, Vietnam and southern China
 Polyptychus trisecta (Aurivillius 1901)
 Polyptychus wojtusiaki Pierre, 2001

References

 
Smerinthini
Moth genera
Taxa named by Jacob Hübner